Vasile Antonescu (born 24 March 1990) is a Romanian professional tennis player.

Antonescu has a career high ATP singles ranking of 465 achieved on 18 May 2015. He also has a career high ATP doubles ranking of 433 achieved on 23 October 2017.

Antonescu represents Romania at the Davis Cup and will make his debut on 28 October 2017 playing doubles with Bogdan Borza against Israel's doubles pair consisting of Jonathan Erlich and Dudi Sela in 2nd round play-offs of Group I.

References

External links

1990 births
Living people
Romanian male tennis players
People from Constanța
21st-century Romanian people